Joseph Cunningham or Joe Cunningham may refer to:

Sportspeople
Joe Cunningham (baseball) (1931–2021), American baseball first baseman and outfielder
Joe Cunningham (Gaelic footballer) (1931–2012), Northern Irish Gaelic footballer
Joe Cunningham (tennis) (1867–1951), American tennis player
Joe Cunningham (baseball, born 1963), baseball player who played in the 1992 St. Louis Cardinals season
Joe Cunningham (hurler), teammate of Kieran Carey
Joey Cunningham, York City F.C. player

Others
Joseph Lewis Cunningham (1784–1843), auctioneer in Boston, Massachusetts
Joseph Davey Cunningham (1812–1851), Scottish historian
Joseph Thomas Cunningham (1859–1935), British zoologist
Joseph Cunningham (Northern Ireland politician) (1877–1965), Unionist politician in Northern Ireland
Joseph F. Cunningham, American jurist
Joe Cunningham (American politician) (born 1982), former member of the United States House of Representatives from South Carolina
Joe Cunningham, actor who appeared in It's in the Air
Joseph Cunningham, member of the Legislative Council of the Isle of Man